Leucania loreyi, the cosmopolitan, false army worm or nightfeeding rice armyworm, is a moth of the family Noctuidae. It is found in most of African countries, the Indo-Australian subtropics and tropics of India, Sri Lanka, Myanmar, the eastern Palearctic realm, and the Near East and Middle East. The species was first described by Philogène Auguste Joseph Duponchel in 1827.

Description

Its wingspan is about 34–44 mm. Forewing greyish ochreous; the veins pale lined with brown, the intervals with brown lines; a short black streak from base below cell; median nervure thickly outlined with fuscous to beyond cell; reniform stigma indicated by a white dot at lower angle of cell; outer line by a row of black dots on veins; a triangular brown subapical patch edged above by an oblique pale streak from apex; hindwing white, the veins towards termen fuscous; abdominal tufts beneath formed of coarse scalelike brown black hairs.

Ecology
The larva is reddish grey, and yellowish between the segments and the dorsal line is fine, grey, and double. The subdorsal lines are divided, interrupted, and all clearer towards the anal segments. spiracles black-ringed. Adults are on wing year round. There are multiple generations per year.

Recorded food plants in Israel include Phragmites australis, Sacharum ravennae and Gramineae species. Occasionally they are found on ornamental bamboo and once in an experimental rice field, a pest of winter cereals (wheat, barley) and summer cereals (corn, sorghum, sugar cane). Other recorded food plant include various grasses, such as Oryza, Paspalum, Saccharum, Triticum and Zea species.

References

External links

 
 Hadeninae of Israel
 A Second Sugarcane Armyworm (Leucania loreyi (Duponchel)) from Australia and the Identity of L. loreyimima Rungs (Lepidoptera: Noctuidae)
 Lepiforum e. V. 

Leucania
Moths described in 1827
Moths of Africa
Moths of Asia
Moths of Cape Verde
Moths of Europe
Moths of Japan
Moths of Madagascar
Moths of the Middle East
Moths of Réunion
Taxa named by Philogène Auguste Joseph Duponchel
Insect pests of millets